The Iwate Big Bulls are a professional basketball team that compete in the third division of the Japanese B.League.

Roster

Notable players

Wayne Arnold
Lawrence Blackledge
Jamal Boykin
Brian Carlwell
Tatsunori Fujie
Alandise Harris
Shota Onodera
Gyno Pomare
Patrick Sanders
Makoto Sawaguchi
Samuel Jr. Sawaji
Dillion Sneed
Noriyuki Sugasawa
Hirohisa Takada
Kenichi Takahashi
Jahmar Thorpe

Coaches

Vlaikidis Vlasios (2011–12)
Shinji Tomiyama
Dai Oketani
Geoffrey Katsuhisa
Yasunori Ueda
Donte Hill
Osamu Okada (es)
Yuma Yoshida
Koji Nagata

Arenas
Morioka Takaya Arena
Iwate Prefectural Gymnasium
Kitakami General Gymnasium
Sea Arena
Dream Arena Takata
U Dome
Hanamaki City General Gymnasium
Z Arena
Kamaishi Citizens Gymnasium
Kuji Citizens Gymnasium
Takizawa General Park Gymnasium
Ninohe City General Sports Center
Kuzumaki Town Social Gymnasium

References

External links

 
Basketball teams in Japan
Sports teams in Iwate Prefecture
Basketball teams established in 2010
2010 establishments in Japan
Sport in Morioka